The Omsk Engine Design Bureau (along OMO named after Baranov) is an aero engine design bureau.  It was originally situated in Moscow in the Soviet Union, but was evacuated in 1941. Operations were moved to a "site of farm machinery" . The Bureau returned to Moscow and became independent on 5 July 1947 and was renamed "OKB-20" .  The bureau absorbed OKB-29 in 1963 and in 1966 was renamed Mashinostoitel'noe KB (MKB). Since 1994, it has been known as Omskoe mashinstroitel'noe KB (or OMKB) .

Although it has had many chief designers and directors, many of the engines from this bureau are known by the name Glushenkov, named for V.A. Glushenkov, a designer from 1963.

In soviet times, some engineers from OMKB and OMO Baranov Polyot left to Zaporozhe Ivchenko Progress (Motor Sich) to manufacture helicopter engine turboshafts, turboprops, turbojets, turbofans and gas turbines. Due to forced soviet decentralization and partly due to medal achievements, engine dimensions and related rewarding, larger aircraft engines where endorsed (rather than smaller turbojets, turbofans, turboprops or helicopter turboshafts).

Products
 Turboshafts, Turbojets, Turboprops, Turbofans, Gas Turbines
 36MT (TRDD-50), R95, 37- turbofan for missiles and UAV UCAV use .
 ob 37-04 (TRDD-50B) Kh-59 MK2
 TVD-10, TVD-20
 AL-21F-3T
 VK-2500
 TV7-117ST, TV3-117VMA-SBM1
 TV1, TV2, TV3-117, AI- Lot D-
 GTD-20 20S(AL-21F-3)
 (capable of building SaM-146 PS90A D30 PD14 D436 AI222(25) RD-33MK engines, TV7-117 class)

 APU
 various APU (such as GTD-5, GTD-5M), reducers, gears

References

External links
Company website

Aircraft engine manufacturers of Russia
Aircraft engine manufacturers of the Soviet Union
Gas turbine manufacturers
1941 establishments in the Soviet Union
United Engine Corporation
Companies based in Omsk
Design bureaus